The 1903–04 Columbia Lions men's basketball team represented Columbia University in intercollegiate basketball during the 1903–04 season. The team finished the season with a 17–1 record and was retroactively named the national champion by the Helms Athletic Foundation and the Premo-Porretta Power Poll.

Schedule

|-
!colspan=9 style="background:#75b2dd; color:#FFFFFF;"| Regular season

Source

References

Columbia Lions men's basketball seasons
Columbia
NCAA Division I men's basketball tournament championship seasons
Columbia Lions Men's Basketball Team
Columbia Lions Men's Basketball Team